Richard Crawley (22 February 1831 – 27 February 1897) was an English cricketer. He played three first-class matches for Cambridge University Cricket Club between 1852 and 1854.

See also
 List of Cambridge University Cricket Club players

References

External links
 

1831 births
1897 deaths
English cricketers
Cambridge University cricketers
Cricketers from Luton
Marylebone Cricket Club cricketers